Shadowing may refer to:

 Shadow fading in wireless communication, caused by obstacles
 File shadowing, to provide an exact copy of or to mirror a set of data
 Job shadowing, learning tasks by first-hand observation of daily behavior
 Projective shadowing, a process by which shadows are added to 3D computer graphics
 Variable shadowing, a variable naming issue in computer programming
 Speech shadowing, a type of experiment in psycholinguistics
 Nuclear shadowing, an effect in nuclear and particle physics
 Surveillance, following someones movements

See also
 
 
 Shadow (disambiguation)
 The shadowing lemma, a key result in the theory of dynamical systems
 Shading